The Raigam Tele'es Best Television Current Affairs Award is a Raigam Tele'es award presented annually in Sri Lanka by the Kingdom of Raigam companies for the best Sri Lankan television current affairs show of the year.

The award was first given in 2005.

Award list in each year

References

Raigam Tele'es